Catholic Memorial High School can refer to:
Catholic Memorial School in West Roxbury, Massachusetts
Catholic Memorial High School in Waukesha, Wisconsin